Angelbert Metoyer (born in July 1977 in Houston, Texas) (AN-gel-bər MUH-twy-ər) is an American visual artist on the forefront of afrofuturism. Metoyer began his artistic career through Rick Lowe's Project Row Houses in Houston, Texas and held his first solo exhibition there in 1994. He subsequently moved to Atlanta to study drawing and painting at the Atlanta College of Art.  Although a bit of a nomad having lived in various parts of the world, Metoyer currently lives in Houston and Rotterdam.

Metoyer's art explores memory and social history through the lenses of science, philosophy, and religion. He works in various media, including drawing, painting, installation, and sound. He appropriates unusual art materials, which he calls "excrements of industry," that include coal, glass, debris, oil, tar, mirrors, and gold dust.

Metoyer's work is in the permanent collections of the US Department of State, Houston Museum of Fine Art, The Charles, H. Wright Museum, African American Museum of Contemporary Art, the ACE Collection, and the Museum of Fine Arts in Leipzig, Germany.  He has shown at the Venice Biennale, Art Basel Miami, and a renegade show Art Basel Switzerland. 

Metoyer is regularly published in essays and studies accompanying exhibitions including Strange Pilgrims. He is also featured as one of five Black artists of particular significance in Collecting Black Studies: The Art of Material Culture at the University of Texas at Austin.

In addition, his artwork has been used in many album and book covers, including Mike Ladd's Negrophilia, Saul Williams' Niggy Tardust, Bilal's In Another Life (2015) and VOYAGE-19 (2020), and Marcus Guillery's Red Now and Laters.

Exhibitions

Selected solo exhibits 
 2019: Clay and Coal: Modern Spirited Essentialism, presented by KRSTO, Monterrey, Mexico
 2017: Angelbert Metoyer, Real Eyes (Realize) - An Artist's Survey: 1987 - 2017, Deborah Colton Gallery, Houston, Texas, United States
 2017: Play for the Sun, Ludlow House, New York City, United States
 2016: Wrestling History: Points Along a Journey of Dis/covery Hidden in the Temple, The New Gallery, Warfield Center Galleries, The University of Texas, Austin, Texas, United States
 2015: Angelbert Metoyer: Life Machine, The Contemporary Austin, presented by Co-Lab Projects Pop-Up @ Canopy, Austin, Texas, United States
 2014: Seasons of Heaven, Deborah Colton Gallery, Houston, Texas, United States
 2012: Angelbert Metoyer, Babies Walk on Water: Present, Future and Time Travel, Deborah Colton Gallery, Houston Texas, United States
 2012: Urban Decay, Ravi Photo Gallery, Hyderabad, India All About Urban Decay
 2011: Levels, Forms and Dimensions, Deborah Colton Gallery, Houston Texas, United States
 2010: Angelbert Metoyer: Icon Execution, G.R. N'Namdi Gallery, Chicago Illinois, United States
 2010: Medicine For a Nightmare (Outdoor Sound Installation), Shoreham, Kent, United Kingdom
 2010: 13 Dimensions, Special Project Space, Dubai, United Arab Emirates
 2010: Angelbert Metoyer: Paintings, Joysmith Gallery, Memphis, Tennessee, United States
 2010: Genograms and Genius: The Genius/The Genitive/The Genius, Gallery Sunsum, Memphis, Tennessee, United States
 2009: War-Beau, The Struggle Between the Eternal and Immortal, Giovanni Rossi Fine Arts during Art Basel Miami Beach Fair Week, Miami, Florida, United States
 2009: Global static, Sandler Hudson Gallery, Atlanta, Georgia, United States
 2009: Lu-x, Thom Andriola/New Gallery, Houston, Texas, United States
 2008: House of Warriors-Part Two, African-American Museum, Dallas, Texas, United States
 2008: House of Warriors-Part One, Gerald Peters Gallery, Dallas, Texas, United States
 2008: Ask, Dactyl Foundation for the Arts and Humanities, New York, New York, United States
 2008: The Lu-X experiment (Dreams), Thom Andriola/New Gallery, Houston, Texas, United States
 2007: Days and Days of Recorded Light, G Gallery, Houston, Texas, United States
 2007: Force of Nature: #2, Paul Rodgers/9W, New York, New York, United States 
 2006: 52 and one (Four Seasons), Sandler Hudson Gallery, Atlanta, Georgia, United States
 2006: Three Brides of Aurora: The Magicians Memory of Myth, Gerald Peters Gallery, Dallas, Texas, United States
 2006: A New World With Its Own Vocabulary, Museum of African-American Life and Culture, Dallas, Texas, United States
 2006: Force of Nature: Masquerade of the Divine, Paul Rogers/9W Gallery, New York, New York, United States
 2006: Angelbert Metoyer, American Art Collector, Scottsdale, Arizona, United States
 2006: Maps to Heaven, G Gallery, Houston, Texas, United States
 2005: Angelbert Metoyer, University Art Gallery, University of California, San Diego, La Jolla, California, United States
 2005: Doors Two Space 11811, G Gallery/Gallery 101, Houston, Texas, United States
 2005: Force of Nature 1, Paul Rogers/9W Gallery, New York, New York, United States
 2005: Angelbert Metoyer, Gerald Peters Gallery, Dallas, Texas, United States
 2004: 13 Moments In a Black Sunrise, Gerald Peters Gallery, Dallas, Texas, United States
 2004: Angelbert Metoyer, Ace Collection, Genesis Park, Houston, Texas, United States
 2004: Music Marking Making Music, Paul Rogers/9W Gallery, New York, New York, United States
 2004: Works On Paper 11011, G Gallery/Gallery 101, Houston, Texas, United States
 2003: Studies For Intergalactic Heavens, Sandler Hudson Gallery, Atlanta, Georgia, United States
 2003: Cosmic Water (God 11611), Thom Andriola /New Gallery, Houston, Texas, United States
 2003: Dark Energy Splitting the Universe, Paul Rogers/9W Gallery, New York, New York, United States
 2003: Oxford Muse Imagi-nation Festival Art Exhibit, Angelbert Imagination Studios, Houston, Texas, United States
 2002: God XXXXX, Thom Andriola/New Gallery, Houston, Texas, United States
 2002: God 11511, Red Bud Gallery, Houston, Texas, United States
 2002: Indigo Temple, Private Venue, Houston, Texas, United States
 1999: God 3, Galveston Arts Center, Galveston, TX, United States
 1999: God 11411, Barbara Davis gallery, Houston, Texas, United States
 1998: Angelbert Metoyer : Recent Work, Barbara Davis Gallery, Houston, Texas, United States
 1998: Angelbert Metoyer: An Exhibit, Gallery Thirty-Nine 17, Houston, Texas, United States
 1998: God 11711, Project Row Houses, Houston, Texas, United States
 1995: Social Relevance, Project Row Houses, Houston, Texas, United States
 1994: Angelbert Metoyer: Solo Exhibition, Project Row Houses, Houston, Texas, United States

Selected group exhibits 
 2017: Afterlife, Tripoli Gallery, Southampton, NY
 2016: A Stirring Song Sung Heroic: African Americans from Slavery to 	Freedom, 1619–1865 and Beyond, Alexandria Museum of Art, Alexandria, Louisiana, United States 
 2016: New Beginnings: The Shape of Things to Come, Galveston Arts Center, Galveston, Texas, United States
 2016: Slip-stream, Curated Works by Susie Kalil, Kirk Hopper Fine Art, Dallas, Texas, United States
 2015: Strange Pilgrims, The Contemporary Austin, Austin, Texas, United States, curated by Heather Pesanti
 2012 Visions of Our 44th President, The Charles H. Right Museum of African American history, Detroit Michigan, United States
 2012: Transformations 2012!, Deborah Colton Gallery, Houston, Texas, United States
 2012: Use Your illusion, curated by Paul Horn, Deborah Colton Gallery, Houston, Texas, United States
 2011: Go West: First Bilateral Contemporary Art Exhibited between France and Texas, Unesco, Paris, France  
 2011: Nobody Knows My Name: The African-American Experience in American Culture, curated by Philip E. Collins, Mckinney Avenue Contemporary, Dallas, Texas, United States
 2011: Mixing the Medium, Deborah Colton Gallery, Houston, Texas, United States
 2011: Getting Louder, Special Project Space, Beijing, China
 2011: Use You Illusion, Deborah Colton Gallery, Houston, Texas, United States, curated by Paul Horn
 2010: London Contemporary VGM, London, United Kingdom
 2010: Texas Drops Off Some Cloth, Museo de Arte Moderno de Trujillio, Trujillio, Peru
 2009: The Talented Ten -part one, Deborah called Gallery, Houston Texas, United States
 2009: Before We Let Go, Hamptons: Tripoli Gallery of Contemporary Art, New York, New York, United States
 2009: Mind Game, Sound Insulation in Collaboration with Artist Madeline Vriesendorp, during Venice Biennale, Venice, Italy
 2009: Object Show, Gorilla Show, Seattle, Washington, United States
 2009: True Cities: Sound Installations About China, Aedes Land Gallery, Berlin, Germany
 2008: Born-Again Again: An Exhibition of Political Commentaries, curated by Eddie Steinhauer, Five Myles, New York, New York, United States
 2008: Hope Change Progress, Art Focus for Obama, curated by Derrick Adams, G.R. N'Namdi Gallery, New York, New York, United States
 2008: Houston Collects: African-American Art, Museum of Fine Arts Houston, Houston, Texas, United States
 2008: Richard Wright At 100, National Civil Rights Museum, Memphis, Tennessee, United States
 2008: Qatar Naked Narratives: A Country Expressed by Its Own Voice, Deborah Colton Gallery, Houston, Texas, United States
 2008: Ulterior Motives, curated by Wayne Gilbert and Jeffrey wheeler, Camp Marfa, Crazywood gallery, Huntsville, Texas, United States
 2008: Born Again and Again #2, curated by Eddie Steinhauer, during Art Basel Miami Beach Fair Week, Miami, Florida, United States
 2007: International Texas Exhibition: Amistad-Texas Art in Peru, curated by Gus Kopriva, Museo de la Nacion, Lima, Peru
 2007: Untitled, Museo de Arte Moderno, foundation Gerardo Chavez, Trujillo, Peru
 2007: Ulterior Motifs No. 10, Arlington Museum of Art, Arlington, Texas, United States
 2007: Ulterior Motifs (Trunk Show), Gerald Peters Gallery, Dallas, Texas, United States
 2007: Ulterior Motifs No. 11, Wichita Falls Museum of Art, Wichita Falls, Kansas, United States Camp Marfa, Huntsville, Texas, United States
 2007: Camp Marfa, Huntsville, Texas, United States, curated by Wayne Gilbert and Lester Marks 
 2006: Houston Contemporary Art, curated by Christopher Zhu and Gus Kopriva, Shanghai Art Museum, Shanghai, China
 2006: In Celebration of the Black Woman, Sandler Hudson Gallery, Atlanta, Georgia, United States
 2006: Six Texas Artists in Germany, MonchsKirche, Salzwedel, Germany
 2006: New Work, Sandler Hudson Gallery, Atlanta, Georgia, United States
 2006: Ulterior Motifs No. 9, Fine Arts Gallery, The Buddy Holly Center, Lubbock, TX, United States
 2004: Round Seventeen, Project Row Houses, Houston, Texas, United States
 2004: Ulterior Motifs No. 7: A Celebratory Art Extravaganza, Amarillo Museum of Art, Amarillo, Texas, United States
 2004: Rubber happiness, San Jose institute of contemporary art, San Jose, California, Traveled to Leipzig, Germany
 2004: The Space Between, Lowell Collins Art Gallery, Houston, Texas, United States
 2004: Ulterior Motifs No.6, A Celebratory Art Extravaganza, Wheeler Brothers Studio, Lubbock, Texas, United States
 2004: Ulterior Motifs No. 8, New Braunfels Museum of Art and Music, New Braunfels, Texas, United States
 2004: Ambros Mundos, El Museo Provincial Emilio Bacardi Moreau de Santiago, Santiago, Cuba
 2003: Marie Thérèse Coincoin Crosses, Special Project Space, Havana, Cuba
 2002: Houston Works, Artco Gallery, Leipzig, Germany
 2001: Our New Day Begun: African-American Artists Entering the New Millennium, Texas Southern University Museum, Houston, Texas (Travelled to LBJ Library-Museum, Austin, Texas and African American Museum, Dallas, Texas, United States)
 2000: Fotofest 2000-The Eighth International Month of Photography, Fotofest, Houston, Texas, United States
 2000: Mania, Artcar museum, Houston, Texas, United States
 1999: Texas Paper: Works On Paper By Texas Artists, The Gallery at UTA, University of Texas at Arlington, Arlington, Texas, United States
 1999: Response Time, Artcar museum, Houston, Texas, United States
 1999: Gallery Artists, New York, Barbara Davis Gallery, Houston, Texas, United States
 1999: Houston Draws, Contemporary Arts Museum Houston, Houston, Texas, United States
 1997: Raw Talent, Camille Love Gallery, Atlanta, Georgia, United States
 1996: Definitions, Gallery 100, Atlanta, Georgia, United States
 1996: Emergence Resurgence, Hammonds House Museum, Atlanta, Georgia, United States
 1996: 200/200, New Vision Art Gallery, Atlanta, Georgia, United States
 1996: Projected, Space One Eleven, Birmingham, Alabama, United States
 1996: Houston Area Exhibition, Blaffer Gallery, University of Houston, Houston, Texas, United States
 1995: Changing Perspectives, Contemporary Arts Museum Houston, Houston, Texas, United States
 1995: Social Syrup, Project Row Houses, Houston, Texas, United States

Art fairs 
 2011: Dallas Art Fair, Deborah Colton Gallery, Dallas, Texas, United States
 2011: Houston Fine Arts Fair, Deborah Colton Gallery, Houston, Texas, United States
 2010: M.M.T. Positivism Project during Art Basel Miami Beach Fair Week, Miami, Florida, United States
 2010: Contemporary Art SF, Gallery Sunsum, San Francisco, California, United States
 2010: Dallas Art Fair, Deborah Colton Gallery, Dallas, Texas, United States
 2009: Renegade show at Venice Biennale
 2009: 911 Installation, Bridge Art Fair, New York, New York, United States

Sound installations 
 2016-17: Collaboration with B. L. A. C. K. I. E. - series of 52 albums to be released over 24 months
 2012: Sonic Graffiti (Sound Installation), Contemporary Arts Museum Houston, Houston, Texas, United States   
 2009: Venice Biennale, renegade art project sonic graffiti   
 2008: Ping Pong Art Space, Guangzho

Album and book cover collaborations 
 Myronn Hardy's Radioactive Starlings:Poems (Princeton University Press)
 Mike Ladd's Negrophilia
 Saul Williams' US (a)
 Saul Williams' Niggy Tardust
 Bilal's In Another Life (2015) and VOYAGE-19 (2020)
 Marcus Guillery's Red Now and Laters.

References

External links
 Official website

1977 births
American artists
Afrofuturists
Living people
Artists from Texas
Atlanta College of Art alumni